This is a list of active and extinct volcanoes in Syria.

References 

Syria

Volcanoes